The Bill Mraz Dance Hall, located at 835 West 34th Street in Houston, Texas, was listed on the National Register of Historic Places on March 5, 1998. However, it was delisted on December 22, 2004, after being destroyed by a fire in October 2004.

See also
National Register of Historic Places listings in outer Harris County, Texas

References

Commercial buildings on the National Register of Historic Places in Texas
National Register of Historic Places in Houston